A flag of Antarctica is a flag or flag design that represents the continent of Antarctica. As a condominium with no single governing body, it does not have an official flag of its own. However, several designs have been created for the purpose of representing the continent.

Flag designs 
Since the 1970s, there have been many designs proposed as a flag for Antarctica.

White flag 

In 1929, members of the British Australian and New Zealand Antarctic Research Expedition on RRS Discovery used white cotton sheeting to improvise a courtesy ensign (a flag used as a token of respect by vessels while in foreign waters) for a continent without a flag of its own. It is now in the National Maritime Museum in London. The white flag was used to represent Antarctica on at least two occasions on the voyage to Antarctica. On 1 August, 1929, The Times noted that "the ship was flying the Union Jack at her forepeak, the white Antarctic flag at the foremast, and the Australian flag at the stern."

Whitney Smith's proposal 

Vexillologist Whitney Smith presented an orange flag with a white emblem in the hoist at the 1978 annual meeting of the North American Vexillological Association (NAVA). The letter A stands for Antarctica, the semi-sphere represents the area below the Antarctic Circle, and the hands represent human protection of the environment. For high visibility, he chose international orange, a color commonly used in the aerospace industry to set objects apart from their surroundings. The bright orange color was also chosen due to its rarity among national flags, as no nation with an active research base on the continent uses the color orange in their flag. The design elements are positioned on the hoist side of the flag so that it would remain visible even if the flag were damaged by the harsh Antarctic winds.

Graham Bartram's proposal

Graham Bartram, the chief vexillologist of British organization Flag Institute, designed another proposal in 1996 for a computer program. Using the flag of the United Nations as his model, he chose a plain white map of the continent on a blue background to symbolize neutrality. Vexillologist Ted Kaye had Bartram's design printed and took them with him on an Antarctic cruise. At Kaye's request, it flew at the Brazilian base Comandante Ferraz and the British museum at Port Lockroy. The Graham Bartram flag design has been used as the "Flag for Antarctica" emoji (🇦🇶) on most supported platforms since 2015.

True South proposal 

The True South proposal was designed by Evan Townsend in 2018. The flag has the following meaning:Horizontal stripes of navy and white represent the long days and nights at Antarctica's extreme latitude. In the center, a lone white peak erupts from a field of snow and ice, echoing those of the bergs, mountains, and pressure ridges that define the Antarctic horizon. The long shadow it casts forms the unmistakable shape of a compass arrow pointed south, an homage to the continent's legacy of exploration. Together, the two center shapes create a diamond, symbolizing the hope that Antarctica will continue to be a center of peace, discovery, and cooperation for generations to come.The flag is named after geographic South, or "true South", which differs from magnetic south.

The flag has quickly gained popularity since its introduction. It has been adopted by some National Antarctic Programs, Antarctic nonprofits, and expedition teams; flown at several research stations across Antarctica; and is used in the 2022 marker for the geographic South Pole.

See also 
 List of Antarctic flags
 Flag of the British Antarctic Territory
 Flag of the Province of Tierra del Fuego, Antarctica and South Atlantic Islands
 Flag of Magallanes y la Antártica Chilena Region
 Flag of the French Southern and Antarctic Lands

References

External links 
 Antarctica — flag proposals

Antarctic culture
Antarctica
Antarctica
 
2002 in Antarctica